Andrea Febbraio is an Italian entrepreneur, writer, professor, and investor. He is the founder of PromoDigital, a company he later sold for four times its revenues after two years of operation. Febbraio also co-founded Ebuzzing (now known as "Teads"), a video adtech company he led from startup to $100 million in revenue after four years of operation.

As a writer, Febbraio is the co-author of Viral Video: Content is King, Distribution is Queen and Buzz Marketing Nei Social Media, business books in the field of digital marketing and social media. Febbraio is an angel investor and venture capitalist as well as a senior lecturer at SDA Bocconi School of Management and LUISS Business School. His success as an entrepreneur was documented in the book Startup di successo, a book detailing 20 years of Italy's internet entrepreneurs.

Career

Febbraio began his career working at internet platform and digital media agencies during the dot-com boom in the 1990s. He is an economics graduate and became a business school lecturer in 2010. Febbraio is the former CEO of PromoDigital, an online advertising company he founded in 2008. The company was the first buzz marketing platform in Italy and was sold two years later to the Wikio Group, Europe's top blog-ranking service.

Febbraio is the co-founder of Ebuzzing (now known as "Teads"), a video adtech company he launched in 2010. The company creates video advertising for companies and is credited as the creator of "outstream video." The company had revenues of $67.5 million in 2013, operating in the United States, Latin America, Europe, and Asia. Ebuzzing has created campaigns for major brands that include Heineken, Acer, LG, and Evian. The content it creates is distributed through 20,000 media, websites, social media sites, and mobile apps. Febbraio remained with the company as the vice president of sales through 2014 when the company's revenue topped $100 million for that year.

Febbraio's expanded his career to encompass that of an educator in 2010. He is a senior lecturer at SDA Bocconi School of Management and LUISS Business School where he teaches M.B.A. students. He is also a professional speaker, previously speaking at events such as the Cannes Lions International Festival of Creativity, Social Media Week, I Strategy, and IAB Forum. His investing career is that of an angel investor as well as a partner in the venture capital firm Adriadne Capital.

As a writer, Febbraio has published two books. The first is Buzz Marketing Nei Social Media, a business book about buzz marketing in social media that was published in 2009. In 2014, he co-authored Viral Video: Content is King, Distribution is Queen along with Dario Caiazzo and Umberto Lisiero.

Bibliography

References

Living people
Italian businesspeople
Italian non-fiction writers
Italian male non-fiction writers
Year of birth missing (living people)